Yekkeh Soud-e Sofla (also Romanized as Yekkeh So‘ūd-e Soflá; also known as Yekkeh So‘ūd-e Pā’īn) is a village in Jargalan Rural District, Raz and Jargalan District, Bojnord County, North Khorasan Province, Iran. At the 2006 census, its population was 2,388, in 544 families.

References 

Populated places in Bojnord County